The Embassy of Albania in London is the diplomatic mission of Albania in the United Kingdom.

A protest was held outside the embassy in 2013 following the proposal to destroy the chemical weapons of Syria in Albania.

Gallery

See also
List of diplomatic missions in London
Albania–United Kingdom relations

References

External links
Official site

Diplomatic missions in London
Diplomatic missions of Albania
Albania–United Kingdom relations
Grade II listed buildings in the City of Westminster
Pimlico